Harrison Creek is a  long 2nd order tributary to the Cape Fear River in Bladen County, North Carolina.

Course
Harrison Creek rises in Harrison Creek Bay, a Carolina Bay, about 5 miles southeast of Cedar Creek, North Carolina in Cumberland County.  Harrison Creek then flows south into Bladen County to join the Cape Fear River about 1.5 miles south of Burney, North Carolina.  The course of Harrison Creek is hard to determine in swamps and with channelization of the stream.

Watershed
Harrison Creek drains  of area, receives about 48.7 in/year of precipitation, has a wetness index of 620.10 and is about 17% forested.

See also
List of rivers of North Carolina

References

Rivers of North Carolina
Rivers of Bladen County, North Carolina
Rivers of Cumberland County, North Carolina
Tributaries of the Cape Fear River